Irreducibility is the philosophical principle that a complete account of an entity is not possible at lower levels of explanation.

Irreducibility may also refer to:

 Biological irreducibility, a creationist objection to evolution
 Irreducibility (mathematics), a concept in mathematics